Vine Valley Methodist Church is United Methodist Church congregation, housed in a historic church located at Middlesex in Yates County, New York.

The structure is a Queen Anne style structure built about 1891.

It was listed on the National Register of Historic Places in 1994.

References

Churches on the National Register of Historic Places in New York (state)
United Methodist churches in New York (state)
Methodist churches in New York (state)
Queen Anne architecture in New York (state)
Churches completed in 1891
19th-century Methodist church buildings in the United States
Churches in Yates County, New York
National Register of Historic Places in Yates County, New York